Edmond Doyle (born 28 August 1877) was an Irish hurler who played as a defender as a forward for the Kilkenny senior team.

Doyle made his first appearance for the team during the 1903 championship and was a regular member of the starting for the next few seasons until his retirement after the 1912 championship. During that time he won six All-Ireland medals and five Leinster medals. 

At club level Doyle was a two-time county championship medalist with Mooncoin.

References

1877 births
Year of death missing
Mooncoin hurlers
Kilkenny inter-county hurlers
All-Ireland Senior Hurling Championship winners